States Steamship Company, also called States Line and SSS, was started in 1928 by Charles Dant, in Portland, Oregon and later moved to the headquarters to San Francisco. Dant started the States Steamship Company to take his lumber product to market. He had a fleet of lumber schooners.  Dant started by leasing ships from the United States Shipping Board - Emergency Fleet Corporation and founded the Columbia Pacific Steamship Company in 1919, Columbia Pacific Steamship Company routes were between Portland, Far East and Europe. In 1928 Dant merged the Columbia Pacific Steamship Company into the States Steamship Company. The Europe route ended in 1932 and the ship moved to a Philippines route. With the shift to container shipping in the 1960s and Dant's fleet of ships becoming older and obsolete, the company into bankruptcy in 1979. States Line operated four subsidies: Pacific-Atlantic Steamship Company, California Eastern Line founded in 1937 for lumber shipping, Oregon Oriental Line and the Quaker Line.

Charles Dant was a major stock holder in the China Import and Export Lumber Company, which had a large sawmill plant in Shanghai.

The Pacific-Atlantic Steamship Company was active with charter shipping with the Maritime Commission and War Shipping Administration for World War II. Pacific-Atlantic Steamship Company also operated charter shipping for the Korea War and Vietnam War.

States Steamship Company flag
In 1928 Charles Dant pick the swastika (at that time symbol of good luck until the 1930s) for this ship's flags. The red flag had a black upright swastika on it. After Adolf Hitler picked the swastika for the Nazi Party flag in 1937, Dant was forced to change his flag. He made two flags a: wedged shaped flag; blue and white with a red vertical stripe at the pole and a blue and white flag with a red seahorse.

States Steamship Company ships
States Steamship Company ports: San Francisco, Portland, Yokohama, Kobe, Shanghai, Hong Kong, Manila Taiwan, Saigon, Bangkok, Okinawa .

 SS General Lee, passenger from United Fruit in 1932
 SS General Pershing, passenger from United Fruit in 1932
 SS General Sherman, passenger from United Fruit in 1932	
 SS Hakozaki Maru
 SS Terukuni Maru
 SS Haruna Maru
 SS Katori Maru
 SS Yasukuni Maru
 SS Hakone Maru
 SS Fushimi Maru
 SS Kaisar-I-Hind
 SS Chitral
 SS Ranpura
 SS Corfu
 SS Ranchi
 SS Naldera
 SS Carthage
 SS San Clemente
 SS San Rafael
 SS Flomar (1919)
 SS President Monroe
 SS President Van Buren
 SS President Polk
 SS President Adams
 SS President Hayes
 SS President Wilson
 SS President Garfield
 SS Gneisenau
 SS Potsdam
 SS Scharnhorst
 SS Ramses
 SS Christiaan Huygens
 SS Johan van Oldenbarnevelt
 SS Johan de Witt
 SS Marnix van St. Aldegonde
 SS Colorado
 SS Montana
 SS Idaho
 SS Nevada, sank 
 SS Wyoming
 SS Michigan, sank off Philippines in storm.
 SS California (1961)
 Empire State VI
 SS Hawaii
 SS M.M. Dant
 SS Arizona
  SS Pennsylvania (1944)
 SS Illinois, June 1, 1942 torpedoed
 SS Oregon, Feb. 28, 1942 shelled by submarine
 SS "Ohio", Unknown 
 SS C.E. Dant
  SS Washington (1941)
 SS San Angela
San Felipe (1919)

Quaker Line and California Eastern Line
Quaker Line and California Eastern ships:
 San Simeon
 SS San Marcos
 SS San Diego
 SS San Lucas
 SS San Vincente
 SS San Rafael
 SS San Anselmo
 SS San Domingo
 SS San Gabriel
 SS San Clemente
 SS San Felipe
 SS San Bernardino
 SS California, torpedoed on Aug. 13, 1942
 SS Illinois
 SS Iowa (1920), sank, all crew lost.
 SS Kentucky, torpedoed on Sept. 18, 1942
 SS Laruel, sank in 1929 on Columbia River with load with lumber.

Pacific-Atlantic Steamship Company

Pacific-Atlantic Steamship Company Chartered ships:

Victory ships
Alma Victory
Billings Victory
SS Boise Victory
SS Davidson Victory
SS Drew Victory
SS Lewiston Victory
SS Middlesex Victory
SS Paducah Victory
SS Wellesley Victory
SS Saginaw Victory
SS Iran Victory 
SS Colgate Victory
SS Nampa Victory

Liberty ships
SS Alan Seeger
SS Jose Pedro Varela
SS Felix Riesenberg
SS Allen C. Balch
SS Robert G. Harper
SS Felix Riesenberg (also to States Line)
SS William Allen White
SS William Sproule
SS J. D. Ross
SS Star of Oregon, Torpedoed and sunk by U-162 off Trinidad
SS Jack London
SS James Devereaux
SS Nathaniel Hawthorne, was torpedoed on Nov. 7, 1942
SS Henry Adams
SS Lucien La Baudt
SS Henry Bacon, Torpedoed and sunk by aircraft in Barents Sea
SS Peter Kerr, bombed on July 5, 1942
SS Elias Howe, bombed on Sept. 24, 1943
SS John Sevier, torpedoed on April 6, 1943
SS Francisco Coronado

Tanker
SS Mission Solano

Type C1 ship
SS Rose Knot (post war)

See also
World War II United States Merchant Navy
Oregon Shipbuilding Corporation

External links
 Liberty Ships built by the United States Maritime Commission in World War II

References

Transport companies established in 1919
Defunct shipping companies of the United States
1979 disestablishments in the United States
Transport companies disestablished in 1979